Archievenblad is a Dutch journal of archival science. It was formed by a merger of Nieuws van archieven and Nederlandsch archievenblad (founded 1892) and is an official journal of Koninklijke Vereniging van Archivarissen in Nederland (the Royal Association of Archivists in the Netherlands).

References

External links 
https://kvan.courant.nu/periodicals/NAB

Dutch-language journals
Information science journals